Roger Stuart Bacon (June 29, 1926 – October 4, 2021) was a Canadian politician who served as the 21st premier of Nova Scotia from 1990 to 1991.

Political career
He was first elected to the Nova Scotia House of Assembly in 1970 as a Progressive Conservative. When his party won the 1978 election, Bacon was Minister of Tourism before becoming Minister of Agriculture in the cabinet of Premier John Buchanan from 1979 to 1988.

Bacon then became Deputy Premier and Minister of Housing until 1990, when he succeeded Buchanan (who had been appointed to the Canadian Senate) to become interim leader of the party and premier of the province for six months until the party chose Donald W. Cameron as its new leader. He did not run for re-election in 1993.

Personal life
Born in Upper Nappan, Nova Scotia in June 1926, Bacon was a dairy farmer and pioneer of the blueberry industry. Bacon died on October 4, 2021, at the age of 95.

References

1926 births
2021 deaths
Canadian people of British descent
Members of the United Church of Canada
Nova Scotia political party leaders
People from Cumberland County, Nova Scotia
Premiers of Nova Scotia
Progressive Conservative Association of Nova Scotia MLAs